is a former Japanese football player. She played for Japan national team.

National team career
Kondo was born on December 1, 1956. In June 1981, she was selected by the Japan national team for the 1981 AFC Championship. She debuted against Chinese Taipei on June 7. That match was the Japan team's first International A Match. She played in all three matches during the championship tournament. In September, she played against Italy. However Japan was defeated by a score of 0–9. That was the worst defeat in the history of the Japan national team. She played four games for Japan in 1981.

National team statistics

References

1956 births
Living people
Japanese women's footballers
Japan women's international footballers
Nissan FC Ladies players
Women's association footballers not categorized by position